James Pratt (1805–1835), also known as John Pratt, and John Smith (1795–1835) were two London men who, in November 1835, became the last two to be executed for sodomy in England. Pratt and Smith were arrested in August of that year after allegedly being spied through a keyhole having sex in the rented room of another man, William Bonill.  Bonill, although not present, was transported to Australia as an accessory to the crime, where he died.

Modern interpretation has cast doubt on the facts and legality of the conviction. In January 2017, Pratt and Smith were among those who were posthumously pardoned by the Alan Turing law which pardoned those who had been convicted of criminalised homosexuality offences which no longer exist in the UK.

Biographies

James Pratt was born in 1805 and worked as a groom. He was married and lived with his wife and children at Deptford, London.

John Smith was born in 1795 and was from Southwark Christchurch. He was described in court proceedings and contemporary newspaper reports as an unmarried labourer, although other sources state he was married and worked as a servant.

Arrest
William Bonill, aged 68, had lived for 13 months in a rented room at a house near the Blackfriars Road, Southwark, London. His landlord stated that Bonill had frequent male visitors, who generally came in pairs, and that his suspicions became aroused on the afternoon of 29 August 1835, when Pratt and Smith came to visit Bonill.

The landlord climbed to an outside vantage point in the loft of a nearby stable building, where he could see through the window of Bonill's room, before coming down to look into the room through the keyhole. Both the landlord and his wife later claimed they both looked through the keyhole and saw sexual intimacy between Pratt and Smith, so the landlord broke open the door to confront them. Bonill was absent but returned a few minutes later with a jug of ale. The landlord went to fetch a policeman and all three men were arrested.

Trial and execution

Pratt, Smith and Bonill were tried on 21 September 1835 at the Central Criminal Court, before Baron Gurney, a judge who had the reputation of being independent and acute, but also harsh. Pratt and Smith were convicted under section 15 of the Offences Against the Person Act 1828, which had replaced the 1533 Buggery Act, and were sentenced to death. William Bonill was convicted as an accessory and sentenced to 14 years of penal transportation. A number of witnesses came forward to testify to the good character of James Pratt. No character witnesses came forward to testify on behalf of John Smith.

The conviction of the three men rested entirely on what the landlord and his wife claimed to have witnessed through the keyhole; there was no other evidence against them. Modern commentators have cast doubts on their testimony, based on the narrow field of vision afforded by a keyhole and the acts (some anatomically impossible) the couple claimed to have witnessed during the brief length of time they were looking.

The magistrate Hensleigh Wedgwood, who had committed the three men to trial, subsequently wrote to the Home Secretary, Lord John Russell, arguing for the commutation of the death sentences, stating:

Although Wedgwood was a deeply religious individual, he contradicted the prevailing view that gay sex was harmful. He also cited the injustice that only poorer men were likely to be caught having it. A rich man could afford a private space that would make being arrested unlikely. Even if arrested, he would have the resources to post bail money, and then flee abroad. However, despite this degree of sympathy, Wedgwood described the men as "degraded creatures" in another letter.

On 5 November 1835, Charles Dickens and the newspaper editor John Black visited Newgate Prison; Dickens wrote an account of this in Sketches by Boz and described seeing Pratt and Smith while they were being held there:

The gaoler who was escorting Dickens confidently predicted to him that the two would be executed and was proven correct. Seventeen individuals were sentenced to death at the September and October sessions of the Central Criminal Court for offenses that included burglary, robbery, and attempted murder. On 21 November, all were granted remission of their death sentences under the Royal Prerogative of Mercy with the exceptions of Pratt and Smith. There had been previous reprievals of men sentenced to death for sodomy, such as Martin Mellet and James Farthing who had been condemned in 1828 but were instead transported to Australia. But this was not granted to Pratt and Smith despite an appeal for mercy submitted by the men's wives that was heard by the Privy Council. A petition for mercy was even made by the landlord and his wife who had been witnesses against them.

Pratt and Smith were hanged in front of Newgate Prison on the morning of 27 November. The crowd of spectators was described in The Times' newspaper report as larger than usual; this was possibly because the hanging was the first to have taken place at Newgate in nearly two years.

The report of the execution in The Morning Post states that when the men were led onto the scaffold the crowd began to hiss, and this continued until the moment of their execution. Possibly this indicated the crowd's disagreement with the execution, or it may have indicated disapproval of the men's alleged acts. James Pratt was reportedly too weak to stand, and had to be held upright by the executioner's assistants while preparations were made to hang him.

The event was sufficiently notable for a printed broadside to be published and sold. This described the men's trial and included the purported text of a final letter that was claimed to have been written by John Smith to a friend.

William Bonill was one of 290 prisoners transported to Australia on the ship Asia, which departed England on 5 November 1835 and arrived in Van Diemen's Land (now Tasmania) on 21 February 1836. Bonill died at the age of 74 at New Norfolk Hospital in Van Diemen's Land on 29 April 1841.

Legacy

A collection of contemporary documents, including petitions made on behalf of the men, and letters about their case are held by the United Kingdom National Archives.

Both James Pratt and John Smith are central characters in the stage play Particular Disposition, written by Benjamin Fulk. The song "45 George Street" by Bird in the Belly tells their story.

Notes

References
Citations

Bibliography

1795 births
1805 births
1835 deaths
English LGBT people
19th-century executions by England and Wales
Duos
Executed people from London
19th-century British LGBT people
People executed for sodomy
People convicted for homosexuality in the United Kingdom
1835 crimes in the United Kingdom
1830s crimes in London